Karakoç is a Turkish word. It may refer to:

People
 Murat Karakoç (born 1979), Turkish footballer
 Pınar Karakoç (born 1972), birth name for Turkish Singer Pınar Ayhan
 Sezai Karakoç (born 1933), Turkish poet
 Yavuz Karakoç (born 1988), Turkish ice hockey player

Places
 Karakoç, Çaycuma, a village in Çaycuma district of Zonguldak Province, Turkey
 Karakoç, Pazaryolu

Turkish-language surnames